Motorway service areas, also known as service stations are places where drivers can leave a motorway to refuel, rest, or take refreshments. Some also incorporate or adjoin hotels. Only 20 motorway services in the UK remain in the ownership of the Department for Transport and let on 50-year leases to private operating companies. The vast majority of motorway services in the UK are owned by one of three companies: Moto, Welcome Break and Roadchef and a developing chain of stations being constructed by Extra.

Some of the 94 service areas on this list are on major A-roads rather than motorways. These share the defining properties of motorway service areas, being named service areas operated by a single company with a range of facilities including food & drink providers, toilet facilities and vehicle servicing facilities. Such service areas are rare on most A-roads, where basic filling stations with a single shop are more common.

Map

Notes

References

External links 

 Motorway Services Info
 Motorway Services Online
 Motorway Services Guide

United Kingdom transport-related lists
Lists of buildings and structures in the United Kingdom
Lists of places in the United Kingdom